The Union of South Africa competed at the 1960 Summer Olympics in Rome, Italy. 55 competitors, 53 men and 2 women, took part in 46 events in 12 sports. After these Olympics, the International Olympic Committee banned South Africa from the Olympic Movement over the policy of apartheid, making these the last Olympics at which South Africa would compete until the repeal of apartheid and the 1992 Summer Olympics in Barcelona, Spain.

Medalists

Silver
 Daniel Bekker — Boxing, Men's Heavyweight

Bronze
 Malcolm Spence — Athletics, Men's 400 metres 
 William Meyers — Boxing, Men's Featherweight

Athletics

Men's Discus Throw 
Fanie du Plessis
 Qualifying Heat — 51.86 (→ did not advance, 23rd place)

Boxing

Cycling

Five male cyclists represented South Africa in 1960.

1000m time trial
 Les Haupt

Tandem
 Les Haupt
 Syd Byrnes

Team pursuit
 Syd Byrnes
 Bobby Fowler
 Abe Jonker
 Rowan Peacock

Gymnastics

Modern pentathlon

One male pentathlete represented South Africa in 1960.

Individual
 Okkie van Greunen

Rowing

South Africa had five male rowers participate in two out of seven rowing events in 1960.

 Men's single sculls
 David Meineke

 Men's coxless four
 David Lord
 Jack Mok
 Trevor Steyn
 John Stocchi

Sailing

South Africa had two male rowers participate in Sailing events in 1960.

 Finn
 Gordon Burn-Wood

 Flying Dutchman
 Hellmut Stauch

Shooting

Five shooters represented South Africa in 1960.

300 m rifle, three positions
 Michiel Victor

50 m rifle, three positions
 Johannes Human
 Michiel Victor

50 m rifle, prone
 Johannes Human
 David du Plessis

Trap
 Wim Peeters
 Eric Lucke

Swimming

Water polo

Group C

Weightlifting

Wrestling

References

External links
Official Olympic Reports
International Olympic Committee results database

Nations at the 1960 Summer Olympics
1960
1960 in South African sport